Phonxay is a district (muang) of Luang Prabang province in northern Laos.

References

Districts of Luang Prabang province